is the third release of the original Super Formation Soccer video game, which was made specially for the 1994 FIFA World Cup.

Summary

There are various playable modes like Exhibition, World Cup, League (sponsored by Adidas) and Tournament (sponsored by Snickers). There were many improvements over the previous two versions, one of the most important being the availability of choosing more teams. All the 24 national teams that partook that year's World Cup are represented (except the inclusion of Japan (that didn't qualify) instead of South Korea), however the latter one was included in the special/hidden teams. Using two special codes, the player will have access to the special/hidden teams which didn't take part in the 1994 World Cup: England, Wales, Uruguay, Denmark, France and South Korea (this one was the one who qualified to the World Cup). The other two hidden teams are "Masters" and "Human". In the World Cup mode there is a sub-mode where the players can face the Asian qualification using only the Japanese national team.

Special version
On September 22 of the same year a new version of the game was released: .

Sequels
 Super Formation Soccer 95: della Serie A
 Super Formation Soccer 96: World Club Edition

References

1994 video games
Association football video games
Human Entertainment games
Japan-exclusive video games
Sports video games set in the United States
Super Nintendo Entertainment System games
Super Nintendo Entertainment System-only games
Video game sequels
Video games set in 1994
Multiplayer and single-player video games
Video games developed in Japan